Megan Kayla Walker (born November 23, 1998) is an American professional basketball player. She played college basketball for the UConn Huskies. Walker was selected to the first team All-American by the Associated Press (AP) and by the U.S. Basketball Writers Association (USBWA) in 2020.

WNBA career
Following the conclusion of the 2019-2020 NCAA season with the UConn Huskies, Walker declared for the 2020 WNBA Draft.

New York Liberty
Walker was drafted 9th overall in the 2020 Draft by the New York Liberty. Due to the COVID-19 Pandemic, Walker's rookie season would be played in Bradenton, Florida in the WNBA Bubble. On July 10, 2020, the Liberty announced that Walker had tested positive for the virus and would miss the start of training camp. Walker made her WNBA debut on July 29, 2020, against the Dallas Wings scoring 2 points in 2 minutes of action. Her highest scoring output for her rookie year came later in the season against the Los Angeles Sparks with 8 points.

On February 10, 2021, the Liberty announced that they had traded Walker, along with Kia Nurse, to the Phoenix Mercury.

Phoenix Mercury
Walker arrived in Phoenix and started 7 games for the Mercury. She scored in double figures 4 times throughout the year - including her career high of 11 points. As the season continued, Walker began to lose minutes and wasn't playing as much as earlier in the year. Although her minutes were cut, Walker and the Mercury earned a spot in the 2021 WNBA Playoffs and the 2021 WNBA Finals - Walker's first postseason action.

On January 13, 2022, the Mercury waived Walker from their roster.

Atlanta Dream
After being waived by the Mercury, the Atlanta Dream claimed Walker off of waivers and added her to the roster to earn a spot on their 2022 team. Walker played in 12 games during the 2022 season for the Dream, averaging 3.3 points and 0.8 rebounds. On June 8, 2022, Walker was traded to the New York Liberty, along with the draft rights to Raquel Carrera in exchange for AD. The Liberty waived her following the trade.

Career statistics

WNBA

Regular season

|-
| style="text-align:left;"| 2020
| style="text-align:left;"| New York
| 18 || 0 || 11.4 || .321 || .140 || .600 || 1.5 || 0.3 || 0.2 || 0.0 || 0.4 || 3.3
|-
| style="text-align:left;"| 2021
| style="text-align:left;"| Phoenix
| 29 || 7 || 14.7 || .311 || .267 || .633 || 1.3 || 0.9 || 0.2 || 0.3 || 0.8 || 4.5
|-
| style="text-align:left;"| 2022
| style="text-align:left;"| Atlanta
| 12 || 0 || 9.6 || .368 || .368 || .667 || 0.8 || 0.4 || 0.3 || 0.0 || 1.0 || 3.3
|-
| style="text-align:left;"| Career
| style="text-align:left;"| 3 years, 3 teams
| 59 || 7 || 12.6 || .322 || .241 || .634 || 1.3 || 0.6 || 0.2 || 0.1 || 0.7 || 3.9

Playoffs

|-
| style="text-align:left;"| 2021
| style="text-align:left;"| Phoenix
| 5 || 0 || 7.8 || .286 || .000 || 1.000 || 0.8 || 0.0 || 0.2 || 0.0 || 1.2 || 1.6
|-
| style="text-align:left;"| Career
| style="text-align:left;"| 1 year, 1 team
| 5 || 0 || 7.8 || .286 || .000 || 1.000 || 0.8 || 0.0 || 0.2 || 0.0 || 1.2 || 1.6

College

|-
| style="text-align:left;"| 2017–18
| style="text-align:left;"| UConn
| 32 || 0 || 15.5 || .444 || .371 || .755 || 3.3 || 0.9 || 0.3 || 0.2 || 0.9 || 5.8
|-
| style="text-align:left;"| 2018–19
| style="text-align:left;"| UConn
| 36 || 36 || 31.3 || .458 || .397 || .742 || 6.7 || 1.9 || 1.0 || 0.3 || 2.1 ||12.1
|-
| style="text-align:left;"| 2019–20*
| style="text-align:left;"| UConn
| 32 || 32 || 33.9 || .477 || .451 || .821 || 8.4 || 2.9 || 1.5 || 0.5 || 2.5 || 19.7
|- class="sortbottom"
| style="text-align:center;" colspan="2"| Career
| 100 || 68 || 26.7 || .460 || .406 || .771 || 6.2 || 1.9 || 0.9 || 0.3 || 1.8 || 12.5

* 2020 NCAA tournament cancelled due to COVID-19 pandemic
Source: uconnhuskies.com

High school

|-
| style="text-align:left;"| 2013–14
| style="text-align:left;"| Monacan HS
| 22 || ... || ... || .384 || .326 || .644 || 6.1 || 1.6 || 2.8 || 1.5 || 2.5 || 19.9
|-
| style="text-align:left;"| 2014–15
| style="text-align:left;"| Monacan HS
| 22 || ... || ... || .407 || .307 || .728 || 7.1 || 1.3 || 2.0 || 1.3 || 2.1 || 19.1
|-
| style="text-align:left;"| 2015–16
| style="text-align:left;"| Monacan HS
| 25 || ... || ... || .409 || .275 || .742 || 8.4 || 1.9 || 3.2 || 0.7 || 2.9 || 21.2
|-
| style="text-align:left;"| 2016–17
| style="text-align:left;"| Monacan HS
| 26 || ... || ... || .421 || .292 || .799 || 7.6 || 1.2 || 3.2 || 1.1 || 2.0 || 25.9
|- class="sortbottom"
| style="text-align:center;" colspan="2"| Career
| 95 || ... || ... || .407 || .301 || .739 || 7.4 || 1.5 || 2.8 || 1.1 || 2.4 || 21.7

Source: maxprep.com

References

1998 births
Living people
All-American college women's basketball players
American women's basketball players
Basketball players from Richmond, Virginia
New York Liberty draft picks
New York Liberty players
Phoenix Mercury players
Atlanta Dream players
Small forwards
UConn Huskies women's basketball players